San Pedro is a Roman Catholic parish church located in the town of Valdunquillo, province of Valladolid, Spain. The church was adjacent to the convent of Nuestra Señora de la Merced Descalza. The church once was dedicated to  Nuestra Señora de la Encarnación. The convent was established in 1607. Made of brick, the church was built in the 18th century. The main retablo is from the 18th century.  The retablo has a copy of the painting of Llanto por Cristo Muerto by Antonio de Pereda; the original is in a Museum of Marseille.

References

Province of Valladolid
Churches in Castile and León
18th-century Roman Catholic church buildings in Spain